Frances Webb "Sister" Strong (born January 11, 1931) is an American politician in the state of Alabama. She was, alongside Ann Bedsole, the first woman to serve in the Alabama Senate. She served as a Democrat representing the 22nd district.

Strong was born and raised in Demopolis, Alabama, the daughter of Mem Creagh Webb and Frances Coleman Webb. Her great-grandfather was the founder of John C. Webb & Sons, a cotton merchandising business. She received the nickname "sister" as the younger of two sisters in her family. A teacher, she also served on the State Elections Commission and Alabama State Democratic Executive Committee prior to her election in 1983. She was married to Gilbert Burke Strong and had five daughters.

References

Living people
Women state legislators in Alabama
Democratic Party Alabama state senators
People from Demopolis, Alabama
American women educators
Educators from Alabama
1931 births
21st-century American women